A pannier is a storage container (basket, bag, or similar) used during transportation.

Pannier can also refer to:

Pannier tank locomotive, a type of steam locomotive
Pannier (clothing), an 18th-century undergarment

People with the surname
Anthony Pannier, French swimmer
Rudolf Pannier (1897–1978), German SS officer